Frank J. Kloucek is a former Democratic member of the South Dakota House of Representatives and South Dakota Senate for District 19.  He served a term in the South Dakota House from 1991 through 1993, 4 terms in the South Dakota Senate from 1993 through 2001, another term in the House from 2001 through 2003, another 4 terms in the Senate from 2003 through 2011 and another term in the South Dakota House of Representatives from 2011 through 2013. Kloucek served as the Democratic Whip for 3 terms and as the Vice-Chair of the Senate Agricultural and Natural Resources Committee in the 1993–1994 session. Following a significant change in district boundaries after the 2011 redistricting, Kloucek ran for South Dakota Senate and lost to past Republican legislator Bill Van Gerpen.

References

External links
South Dakota Legislature – Frank Kloucek official SD Senate website

Project Vote Smart – Representative Frank J. Kloucek (SD) profile
Follow the Money – Frank J Kloucek
2008 2006 2004 2002 2000 campaign contributions

Democratic Party South Dakota state senators
Democratic Party members of the South Dakota House of Representatives
1956 births
Living people
Farmers from South Dakota
South Dakota State University alumni
People from Yankton, South Dakota
People from Scotland, South Dakota